Peter Hervik (born 1956) is a Danish anthropologist and professor whose work focuses on the media's representations and popular consciousness in the context of identities and everyday lives of ethnic minorities, immigrants and refugees in Denmark.

He received his Ph.D. in anthropology at the University of Copenhagen. He completed his Ph.D. thesis based on ethnographic fieldwork in Yucatán Mexico where he studied the incongruency between external discourses of "Maya culture" and the self-categorization of people associated with "Mayan culture".

Peter Hervik had done work on Muhammad cartoon crisis showing how the news media shapes understandings and perceptions of Islam and Muslims in Denmark. He also analyzed the role of anthropological inquiry in addressing media representations of migrant minorities. In his book The Annoying Difference; The Emergence of Danish Neo-nationalism, Neo-racism, and Populism the post 1989 World (2011) he criticizes the approach taken by the Danish People's Party to immigration and discusses how immigration policy developments affect migrant minorities in Denmark.

Hervik was a professor of Media and Migration at Aalborg University.

Selected works 

(2011) – The Annoying Difference : The emergence of Danish neonationalism, neoracism, and populism in the post-1989-world.

(2003) – Mayan People Within and Beyond Boundaries. Social Categories and Lived Identity in Yucatan

(2002) – Mediernes muslimer. En antropologisk undersøgelse af mediernes dækning af religioner i Danmark

(1994) – and Peter Hervik, Social Experience and Anthropological Knowledge

References

External links 
 Personal Website
 University Personal Profile

Living people
Academic staff of Aalborg University
Danish anthropologists
1956 births

da:Kirsten Hastrup